This is a list of career statistics of Ukrainian tennis player Dayana Yastremska since her professional debut in 2015. Yastremska has won three WTA singles titles.

Performance timelines

Only main-draw results in WTA Tour, Grand Slam tournaments, Fed Cup/Billie Jean King Cup and Olympic Games are included in win–loss records.

Singles
Current after the 2023 Indian Wells Open.

Doubles
Current through the 2022 Wimbledon Championships.

Significant finals

WTA Premier M & Premier 5 finals

Doubles: 1 (runner-up)

WTA career finals

Singles: 5 (3 titles, 2 runner-ups)

Doubles: 1 (runner-up)

Junior Grand Slam tournament finals

Girls' singles: 1 (runner-up)

Girls' doubles: 1 (runner-up)

ITF finals

Singles: 6 (3 titles, 3 runner-ups)

Doubles: 3 (3 titles)

WTA rankings

WTA Tour career earnings
current as of 23 May 2022
{|cellpadding=3 cellspacing=0 border=1 style=border:#aaa;solid:1px;border-collapse:collapse;text-align:center;
|-style=background:#eee;font-weight:bold
|width="90"|Year
|width="100"|Grand Slam <br/ >titles|width="100"|WTA <br/ >titles
|width="100"|Total <br/ >titles
|width="120"|Earnings ($)
|width="100"|Money list rank
|-
|2015
|0
|0
|0
| align="right" |1,012
|1443
|-
|2016
|0
|0
|0
| align="right" |15,970
|418
|-
|2017
|0
|0
|0
| align="right" |39,851
|303
|-
|2018
|0
|1
|1
| align="right" |333,427
|109
|-
|2019
|0
|2
|2
| align="right" |1,224,080
|31
|-
|2020
|0
|0
|0
| align="right" |486,190
|43
|-
|2021
|0
|0
|0
|align="right" |232,605
|156
|-
|2022
|0
|0
|0
|align="right" |237,788
|75
|-
|Career|0|3|3| align="right" |2,584,159
|220
|}

Career Grand Slam statistics

Grand Slam tournament seedings
The tournaments won by Yastremska are in boldface, and advanced into finals by Yastremska are in italics.

Best Grand Slam tournament results details

Longest winning streaks
8-match win-streak (2018)
8 consecutive matches won by Yastremska in the fall of 2018 is the longest win-streak of her career thus far (Hong Kong and Luxembourg).

Head-to-head record

Record against top 10 players
Yastremska's record against players who have been ranked in top 10. Active players are in boldface:

Record against No. 11–20 players 
Yastremska's record against players who have been ranked world No. 11–20. Active players are in boldface:

 Donna Vekić 3–1
 Varvara Lepchenko 2–0
 Peng Shuai 2–0
 Alizé Cornet 1–1
 Wang Qiang 1–0
 Kirsten Flipkens 1–1
 Markéta Vondroušová 1–2
 Jennifer Brady 0–1
 Kaia Kanepi 0–1
 Elise Mertens 0–1
 Anastasia Pavlyuchenkova 0–1
 Magdaléna Rybáriková 0–1
 Petra Martić 0–1
 Daria Gavrilova 0–2
 Alison Riske 0–2
 Karolína Muchová 0–3
 Veronika Kudermetova''' 0–3

Top 10 wins

Singles
Yastremska has a 3–12 record against players who were, at the time the match was played, ranked in the top 10 as of February 16, 2022.

Doubles

Notes

References

External links
 
 

Yastremska, Dayana